Dichomeris deceptella is a moth in the family Gelechiidae. It was described by Snellen in 1903. It is found on Java.

The forewings are light grey with an elongate transverse black mark at one-third. The hindwings are dark grey.

References

Moths described in 1903
deceptella